A Soulslike (also spelled Souls-like) is a subgenre of action role-playing and action-adventure games known for high levels of difficulty and emphasis on environmental storytelling, typically in a dark fantasy setting. It had its origin in Demon's Souls and the Dark Souls series by FromSoftware, the themes and mechanics of which directly inspired several other games. Soulslike games developed by FromSoftware themselves have been specifically referred to as Soulsborne games, a portmanteau of Souls and Bloodborne. Soulslikes have been adopted by a number of critics and developers. However, it has also received questions whether it is a true genre or a collection of shared mechanics.

Concepts

Gameplay 
Soulslike games typically have a high level of difficulty where repeated player character death is expected and incorporated as part of the gameplay, losing all progress if certain checkpoints have not been reached. Soulslike games usually have means to permanently improve the player character's abilities as to be able to progress further, often by a type of currency that can be earned and spent, but may be lost or abandoned between deaths if not appropriately managed, similar to the souls in the Souls series. Since the introduction of the bonfires in Dark Souls, many games have adopted similar progression mechanics; serving either as a reset, leveling and traveling beacon in games. This mechanic provides a means to avoid an outright failure state, where the player must restart the game completely and lose all progress, while still providing a risk-and-reward system to make the game challenging to the player. The need for repeated playthroughs can be viewed as a type of self-improvement for the player, either through gradual improvement of their character, or improving their own skills and strategies within the game. Salt and Sanctuary developer James Silva said Soulslike games provided "deliberate and meaningful exploration" of the entire game, including the game world, character improvement, and combat, through learning by repeated failures. Combat in Soulslike games may also be methodical, requiring the player to monitor stamina to avoid overexertion of their character, and often is based on "animation priority" actions that prevent the player from cancelling movement until the animation has been played out, leaving them vulnerable to enemy attacks. Souls and its related games developed by FromSoftware include multiplayer features such as writing messages that can be seen and rated by other players, apparitions of other players, blood stains that can be interacted with to view another player's death, invading another player, and summoning another player to one's own world for assistance.

Setting and plot 
Soulslike games are commonly defined by their dark fantasy setting and lack of overt storytelling, as well as their deep worldbuilding, with a captivating world being cited as key to spark players' desire to explore. Players are meant to discover bits and pieces of the game's lore over time via environmental storytelling, item descriptions and cryptic dialogue, piecing it together themselves to increase the game's sense of mystery. Despite their dark themes, the settings of Soulslikes sometimes feature elements of comic relief, such as unexpected interactions (e.g. petting a cat), humorous reactions from non-player characters, peculiar outfits and weapons, and unusual, often slapstick means of death, such as being eaten by a Mimic.

History 
The Soulslike genre had its genesis in Demon's Souls (2009), developed by FromSoftware and directed by Hidetaka Miyazaki. It introduced the core tenets that would be followed by the Dark Souls series, such as the combat, death mechanics, multiplayer, storytelling, and dark fantasy setting. Dark Souls was released as a spiritual successor in 2011. Games considered to be Soulslikes include the FromSoftware games Bloodborne (2015), and Elden Ring (2022); these, along with Demon's Souls and the Dark Souls series are considered as part of a Soulsborne genre (a portmanteau of Souls and Bloodborne) to describe Soulslike games specifically by FromSoftware. Sekiro: Shadows Die Twice, also directed by Hidetaka Miyazaki, is sometimes considered a Soulsborne game due to its similar design and shared mechanics, but differs in its setting and roleplaying elements.

Other notable Soulslike games include Lords of the Fallen (2014), Titan Souls (2015), DarkMaus (2016), Salt and Sanctuary (2016), the Nioh series, The Surge series, Darksiders III (2018), Ashen (2018), Dark Devotion (2019), Remnant: From the Ashes (2019), Code Vein (2019), Star Wars Jedi: Fallen Order (2019), Hellpoint (2020), Mortal Shell (2020), Chronos: Before the Ashes (2020), and Stranger of Paradise: Final Fantasy Origin (2022).

Other games outside of the genre cited to have been influenced by the Souls series include The Witcher 2: Assassins of Kings (2011), Journey (2012), Shovel Knight (2014), Destiny (2014), The Witcher 3: Wild Hunt (2015), God of War (2018), Assassin's Creed Odyssey (2018), Dead Cells (2018), Death's Gambit (2018), and Blasphemous (2019). Similar death mechanics are used in Nier: Automata (2017) and Hollow Knight (2017).

Reception 
Interviews with developers of Soulslike games revealed that they all thought of being classified as part of the genre as a positive thing that functioned as a useful description for players. However, some believed that it could be misleading, causing players to expect certain things and be disappointed when a game does not have them. An example of this was players being disappointed that Remnant: From the Ashes was primarily a shooter, despite being characterized as a soulslike.

Austin Wood of PC Gamer criticized the Soulslike label, saying that treating Souls games as a template "misleads" players into believing that various games classified as such are similar to Souls when they are really different. He called the Soulslike label, along with the Metroidvania and roguelike labels, "jargon" that "ignores what makes [the games] unique". Mark Brown of Game Maker's Toolkit also decried the Soulslikes as overly restrictive, forcing games to fall into a certain template and preventing their design from advancing. In responding to this argument, Bruno Dias of Vice disagreed, saying that Brown's comparison of Soulslikes with roguelikes was not apt because roguelikes were a hobbyist pursuit for a long time. He also said that Soulslikes did not need to advance yet as they did not have a marketability problem.

See also 
 Roguelike
 Metroidvania

References 

 
Dark Souls
Video game genres